Antey-Saint-André is a comune in the Aosta Valley region of northwestern Italy.

Frazioni
Frazioni (locally officially called hameaux, in French) and other villages or hamlets include: Avout, Bourg, Buisson, Cérian, Challien, Chessin, Covalou, Épaillon, Fiernaz, Filey, Grand-Moulin, Hérin, Liex, Lillaz, Lod, Moulin, Navillod, Noussan, Nuarsaz, Petit-Antey, Ruvère, Villettaz

Twin towns — sister cities
Antey-Saint-André is twinned with:

  Sant'Andrea Apostolo dello Ionio, Italy
  Mornac-sur-Seudre, France
  Les Mathes, France

References

Cities and towns in Aosta Valley